Vexillum cingulatum is a species of small sea snail, marine gastropod mollusk in the family Costellariidae, the ribbed miters.

Description
The length of the shell attains 53 mm.

Distribution
This marine species occurs off Mozambique, the Philippines, Sri Lanka and Indonesia.

References

External links
 Lamarck (J.B.M.de). (1811). Suite de la détermination des espèces de Mollusques testacés. Mitre (Mitra.). Annales du Muséum National d'Histoire Naturelle. 17: 195-222
 Bory de St.-Vincent (J.B.G.M.). (1827). Tableau encyclopédique et méthodique des trois règnes de la nature. Vers, coquilles, mollusques et polypiers. Tome 1: part 29, pp. 83-84, 133-180
 Lamarck, (J.-B. M) de. (1822). Histoire naturelle des animaux sans vertèbres. Tome septième. Paris: published by the Author, 711 pp]

cingulatum
Gastropods described in 1811